Paltalu or Paletlu may refer to:
 Paletlu, East Azerbaijan
 Paltalu, Zanjan